Gilberto Vendemiati (born 27 May 1940) is an Italian former professional racing cyclist.

Career
He rode in the 1965 Tour de France as well as in three editions of the Giro d'Italia.

As of 2019, Vendemiati still rides his bike for up to 50 to 60 kilometers.

Major results
1961
 1st 
 1st Stage 8 Tour de l'Avenir
1962
 1st Overall Giro della Valle d'Aosta
1st Stage 1
1965
 8th Giro di Romagna

Grand Tour general classification results timeline

References

External links
 

1940 births
Living people
Italian male cyclists
Sportspeople from Ferrara
Cyclists from Emilia-Romagna